Giacomo Da Re (born 29 March 1999) is an Italian rugby union player. His preferred position is fly-half and fullback. He currently plays Benetton Rugby in United Rugby Championship.

In 2019 Da Re was named in the Italy Under 20 squad. On the 14 October 2021, he was selected by Alessandro Troncon to be part of an Italy A 28-man squad and on 8 December he was named in Emerging Italy 27-man squad for the 2021 end-of-year rugby union internationals.
On 13 January 2022,  Da Re was named in the Italian squad for 2022 Six Nations Championship.On the 30 May 2022, Da Re was selected by Kieran Crowley to be part of an Italy 33-man squad for the 2022 mid-year rugby union tests. He made his debut against Portugal.

References

External links

1999 births
Italian rugby union players
Living people
Rugby union fly-halves
Rugby union fullbacks
Mogliano Rugby players
Rugby Rovigo Delta players
Benetton Rugby players
Italy international rugby union players